OceanLab (or Above & Beyond presents OceanLab) is a vocal trance group formed in London, England, in 2000, consisting of vocalist Justine Suissa and the three members of Above & Beyond: Jono Grant, Paavo Siljamäki, and Tony McGuinness. After a several year hiatus, the group announced their return with a new single at Above & Beyond's ABGT150 concert in September 2015.

History
The group's initial success was aided in part by popular trance musicians remixing their original work. Their first single, released in 2001, was the song "Clear Blue Water" which was remixed by several artists — the most successful of which was by Ferry Corsten. The track peaked at #48 in the UK Singles Chart in April 2002. The second single "Sky Falls Down" was released in 2002 and remixed by Armin van Buuren. The third single "Beautiful Together" was released in 2003 and was remixed by Seraque, Silvester and Signum. The single that is considered to be their break-through track is "Satellite" their fourth single which was released in 2004. It reached #19 in the UK chart in May 2004, higher than any other track released by the act, or Above & Beyond on their own. Its chart position was assisted by being playlisted on BBC Radio 1.

On 24 August 2007, "Breaking Ties" (Above & Beyond's Analog Haven Mix), was featured on Trance Around the World Episode #178.  Although Miracle was given as the title on the Above & Beyond official forum, at the time the title was unconfirmed.

McGuinness and Siljamäki of OceanLab discussed the album during an interview in Riga, Latvia: We've been experimenting with a completely new sound - one of the tracks we're working on right now features a 56 piece mouse choir. We went diving in Formentera too to record some noises from the dolphins.

On 14 March 2008, "Sirens of the Sea" (Above & Beyond Club Mix) premiered on Trance Around the World Episode #207. It was presented as one of the new singles for the upcoming album. Prior to this, "Sirens of the Sea" (Kyau & Albert Remix) was released on Above and Beyond'''s Anjunabeats Volume 3.

On 7 April 2008, the single "Sirens of the Sea" was released. New remixes by Sonorous, Cosmic Gate, Maor Levi, as well as the Kyau & Albert remix were included.

On 10 June 2008, OceanLab's debut album - Sirens of the Sea - was announced on the Anjunabeats website with a release date of 21 July 2008. The single, "Miracle", appeared a week earlier on 14 July 2008. Included in the single are Above and Beyond's Club Mix of tracks, as well as remixes by Martin Roth, Michael Cassette and Fletch. The "Sirens of the Sea Remixed" album released in 2009 includes the most successful remixes of OceanLab's three most popular tracks that had only been released as singles - Satellite, Sky Falls Down and Clear Blue Water.

On 30 January 2014, McGuinness and Siljamäki confirmed via Reddit that the artist name OceanLab would no longer be used on future productions, with Justine Suissa now being identified as a part of Above & Beyond.

On 26 September 2015, however, Above & Beyond featured a new surprise OceanLab production at ABGT150 in Sydney, Australia, titled Another Chance. It was released as a single containing the original mix and the Above & Beyond Club Mix on 4 November 2016. 

On 24 September 2016, Above & Beyond featured a new OceanLab production at ABGT200 in the Ziggo Dome, Amsterdam. The title of this new single is Alright Now.  The Above & Beyond Club Mix of the track was released originally on Anjunabeats Volume 13, but was released as a standalone single on 12 May 2017.  It was released on Above & Beyond's 2018 album Common Ground.

Discography

Albums
 2008 Sirens of the Sea 2009 Sirens of the Sea Remixed''

Singles
 2001 "Clear Blue Water" - UK #48 (in 2002)
 2002 "Sky Falls Down"
 2003 "Beautiful Together"
 2004 "Satellite" - UK #19
 2008 "Sirens of the Sea"
 2008 "Miracle"
 2008 "Breaking Ties"
 2008 "Come Home"
 2009 "On A Good Day"
 2009 "Lonely Girl"
 2010 "On A Good Day (Metropolis)"
 2016 "Another Chance"

Remixes
 2001 Teaser - "When Love Breaks Down" (OceanLab Remix)
 2002 Ascension - "For a Lifetime" (OceanLab Remix)

References

External links

 Oceanlab on Spotify

English electronic music groups
British trance music groups
Armada Music artists
2000 establishments in England
Musical groups established in 2000
Musical groups from London
Anjunabeats artists